The 2013 Ivy League Baseball Championship Series was held at Robertson Field at Satow Stadium on the campus of Columbia University in New York, New York, on May 4, 2013. Columbia won their second series championship in two games and claimed the Ivy League's automatic berth in the 2013 NCAA Division I baseball tournament.

Through the 2013 championship, Dartmouth had appeared in the Ivy League Championship Series every year since 2008, winning in 2009 and 2010.

Results
Game One

Game Two

References

Ivy League Baseball Championship Series
Ivy League Baseball Championship Series
Tournament
Baseball in New York City
College sports in New York City
Sports competitions in New York City
Sports in Manhattan
2010s in Manhattan
Inwood, Manhattan